A list of Royal Norwegian Navy bases both past and present.

Active
Haakonsvern orlogsstasjon established 1962, the main base.
Ramsund Naval Base is a Norwegian logistics base and holds a detachment of Norwegian Naval EOD Commandos and includes training facilities for the Norwegian Naval Special Operations Command. While having no permanent troops stationed there, the US Navy rotates contractors and military personnel in order to maintain facilities and service US ships.
Trondenes Fort established 1943, main base for the Norwegian Coastal Ranger Command.
Sortland Naval Base, base for Coast Guard Squadron North of the Norwegian Coast Guard.
KNM Harald Haarfagre at Madla, Royal Norwegian Navy (and Air Force) Basic Training Establishment.
Karljohansvern former main base, minor units still present.
Including Norske Løve Fortress

Ceremonial commands
Places where the Navy has the formal command and maintains a commandantship, but where the military activity beyond administration and ceremony is very low.

Bergenhus Fortress (ca. 1200–today)
Including Sverresborg
Vardøhus Fortress (1306–today)

Former bases
Olavsvern (?–2009) auxiliary base. 
Fredriksvern (1677–2002), was the main base until 1864.
Hysnes orlogsstasjon (?–2002)
Marvika orlogsstasjon(?–2002)
Ulsnes orlogsstasjon(?–2002)

Coastal artillery forts and fortresses
Coastal artillery was part of the Navy organisation from 1934 until it was disbanded in 2002.

 Agdenes Fortress 1898 -
 Brettingen Fort
 Hysnes Fort
Hambara Fort
 Bolærne Fort (1916–2005) Located outside Tønsberg, outer oslofjord. Disbanded.
 Breiviknes Fort Disbanded
 Fjell Fortress (1942–2004), disbanded 1999, sold 2004.
 Grøtsund Fort Disbanded.
 Herdla Fort (1940–2001) Disbanded, now a museum.
 Korsnes Fort Disbanded, and demolished
 Krossodden Fort
 Kråkvåg Fort Disbanded and demolished
 Kvalvik Fort
 Malangen Fort Disbanded and demolished
 Meløyvær Fortress Disbanded, now a museum.
 Nes Fort (?–2001) Disbanded and demolished
 Nesje Fort (1940–2004), in the Sognefjord, the fort was handed over to the Norwegian Home Guard in 1958 and was operated by that organisation until 2004.
 Oddane Fort - maintained as a possible future museum.
 Odderøya Fort (1667–1999), at Odderøya near Kristiansand.
 Oscarsborg Fortress (1643–2003)
 Rauøy Fort Disbanded and partly demolished. Now a training ground for Norwegian special forces.
 Rødbergodden Fort
 Skjellanger Fort Disbanded
 Vigdel Fort, near Stavanger
 Visterøy Fort Disbanded
 Årøybukt Fort Disbanded

References

 
Naval lists